This is a list of yearly Big Sky Conference football standings.

Big Sky standings

References

Big Sky Conference
Standings